Ruby R. Manoharan is an Indian politician who is a Member of Legislative Assembly of Tamil Nadu. He was elected from Nanguneri as an Indian National Congress candidate in 2021.

Elections contested

References 

Tamil Nadu MLAs 2021–2026
Living people
Year of birth missing (living people)
Indian National Congress politicians from Tamil Nadu